The John H. Dunning Prize is a biennial book prize awarded by the American Historical Association for the best book in history related to the United States. The prize was established in 1929, and is regarded as one of the most prestigious national honors in American historical writing.  Currently, only the author's first or second book is eligible. Laureates include Oscar Handlin, John Higham, Laurel Thatcher Ulrich and Gordon Wood. The Dunning Prize has been shared five times, most recently in 1993. No award was made in 1937.

List of prize winners
Source:

2021 -- Bathsheba Demuth, Floating Coast: An Environmental History of the Bering Strait
2019 -- Christina N. Snyder, Great Crossings: Indians, Settlers, and Slaves in the Age of Jackson
2017 -- Matthew Karp, This Vast Southern Empire: Slaveholders at the Helm of American Foreign Policy
2015 -- Kate Brown, Plutopia: Nuclear Families, Atomic Cities, and the Great Soviet and American Plutonium Disasters 
2013 -- Jennifer Ratner-Rosenhagen, American Nietzsche: A History of an Icon and His Ideas 
2011—Darren T. Dochuk, From Bible Belt to Sunbelt: Plain-Folk Religion, Grassroots Politics, and the Rise of Evangelical Conservatism
2009 -- Peggy Pascoe, What Comes Naturally: Miscegenation Law and the Making of Race in America
2007—Linda L. Nash, Inescapable Ecologies: A History of Environment, Disease, and Knowledge
2005—Jon T. Coleman, Vicious: Wolves and Men in America
2003—Michael Willrich, City of Courts: Socializing Justice in Progressive Era Chicago
2001—Ernest Freeberg, The Education of Laura Bridgman: First Deaf and Blind Person to Learn Language
1999—Marilyn C. Baseler, Asylum for Mankind: America, 1607-1800
1997—Kathleen M. Brown, Good Wives, Nasty Wenches, and Anxious Patriarchs: Gender, Race, and Power in Colonial Virginia
1995—Daniel Vickers, Farmers and Fishermen: Two Centuries of Work in Essex County, Massachusetts, 1630–1850
1993—A. Gregg Roeber, Palatines, Liberty, and Property: German Lutherans in Colonial British America
1993—Daniel H. Usner, Indians, Settlers, and Slaves in a Frontier Exchange Economy: The Lower Mississippi Before 1783
1991—Eric Arnesen, Waterfront Worker of New Orleans: Race, Class, and Politics, 1863-1923
1990 -- Laurel Thatcher Ulrich, A Midwife’s Tale: The Life of Martha Ballard, Based on Her Diary, 1785-1812
1989 -- Drew R. McCoy, The Last of the Fathers: James Madison and the Republican Legacy 
1988—Joseph E. Stevens, Hoover Dam: An American Adventure
1987—Allan Kulikoff, Tobacco and Slaves: The Development of Southern Cultures in the Chesapeake, 1680-1800
1986 -- Barbara J. Fields, Slavery and Freedom on the Middle Ground: Maryland during the 19th Century
1984 -- Nick Salvatore, Eugene V. Debs: Citizen and Socialist
1982—David J. Jeremy, Transatlantic Industrial Revolution: The Diffusion of Textile Technologies between Britain and America
1980—John D. Unruh Jr., The Plains Across: The Overland Emigrants and the TransMississippi West, 1840-60
1978—J. Mills Thornton, Politics and Power in a Slave Society: Alabama, 1800-1861
1976 -- Thomas S. Hines, Burnham of Chicago: Architect and Planner
1974 -- Paul S. Boyer, Salem Possessed: The Social Origins of Witchcraft
1974—Stephen Nissenbaum, Salem Possessed: The Social Origins of Witchcraft
1972 -- John Patrick Diggins, Mussolini and Fascism: The View from America
1970 -- Gordon S. Wood, The Creation of the American Republic, 1776-1787
1968—Robert L. Beisner, Twelve Against Empire: The Anti-Imperialists, 1898-1900 
1966—John W. Shy, Toward Lexington: The Role of the British Army in the American Revolution
1964—John H. Cox, Politics, Principle, and Prejudice, 1865-66)
1964 -- LaWanda Cox, Politics, Principle, and Prejudice, 1865-66
1962—E. James Ferguson, The Power of the Purse: A History of American Public Finance, 1776-90
1960 -- Eric McKitrick, Andrew Johnson and Reconstruction
1958—Marvin Bud Meyers, The Jacksonian Persuasion
1956 -- John Higham, Strangers in the Land: Patterns of American Nativism
1954—Gerald H. Carson, The Old Country Store
1952 -- Louis C. Hunter, Steamboats on the Western Rivers: An Economic and Technological History
1952—Beatrice Jones Hunter, Steamboats on the Western Rivers: An Economic and Technological History
1950 -- Henry Nash Smith, Virgin Land: The American West as Symbol and Myth
1948—William E. Livezey, Mahan on Sea Power
1946—David M. Ellis, Landlords and Farmers in the Hudson Mohawk Region
1944—Elting E. Morison, Admiral Sims and the Modern American Navy
1942 -- Oscar Handlin, Boston's Immigrants
1940 -- Richard W. Leopold, Robert Dale Owen
1938—Robert A. East, Business Enterprise in the American Revolutionary Era
1935 -- Angie Debo, The Rise and Fall of the Choctaw Republic
1933—Amos A. Ettinger, The Mission to Spain of Pierre Soule
1931 -- Francis Butler Simkins, South Carolina During Reconstruction
1931—R. H. Woody, South Carolina During Reconstruction
1929—Haywood J. Pearce Jr., Benjamin H. Hill: Secession and Reconstruction

See also

 List of history awards

References

External links 
 AHA Dunning Prize description

American Historical Association book prizes
American history awards
American non-fiction literary awards